Rich List or The Rich List may refer to:

Lists of rich people
 Financial Review Rich List, formerly BRW Rich 200, a list of Australia's wealthiest individuals and families
 National Business Review Rich List, an annual list of richest New Zealanders
 Sunday Times Rich List, a list of the wealthiest people or families resident in the United Kingdom

Television shows
 The Rich List (Australian game show), 2007–2009
 Rich List (German game show), 2007–2008
 The Rich List (American game show), one episode in 2006

See also
 Who Dares Wins (British game show), based on the American show
 Forbes 400, or 400 Richest Americans, a list published by Forbes magazine 
 The World's Billionaires, an annual list compiled by Forbes
 Bloomberg Billionaires Index, a daily ranking of the world's top 500 richest people
 List of Chinese by net worth
 List of French billionaires by net worth
 List of South Korean billionaires by net worth
 List of wealthiest families
 List of wealthiest historical figures
 List of wealthiest organizations